Todor "Toše" Proeski (25 January 1981 – 16 October 2007) was a Macedonian multi-genre singer and songwriter. Considered a top act of the local Macedonian and Balkan music scene, Proeski's music was popular across multitude of countries of Southeast Europe. He was dubbed the "Elvis Presley of the Balkans" by BBC News. He died in a car crash on the Zagreb–Lipovac A3 highway, near Nova Gradiška in Croatia, on the morning of 16 October 2007, aged 26.

Biography

Early years
Proeski was born in Prilep and grew up in Kruševo into an Aromanian family. After his musical talent was discovered at the age of 12, he was chosen to perform at the popular children's song festival Zlatno Slavejče (eng.: Golden Nightingale) in Skopje, performing the song "Јаs i mојоt dеdо" in the Aromanian language. This was his first public music performance; however, his successful career began in 1996 when he participated in the teenage music festival Melfest in Prilep.

Following this public exposure, he was acclaimed for his strong vocal capabilities. This led to his rise to fame when he participated in the music festival Makfest in Štip with the song "Pušti me" ("Let Me Go") in 1997. His fanbase quickly grew and he continued to make use of festivals, such as SkopjeFest and OhridFest, as a platform for promotion and publicity. Proeski collaborated with one of Macedonia's acclaimed lyricists and composers, Grigor Koprov, to produce some of his most successful songs, such as "Usni na usni" ("Lips over Lips") and "Sonce vo tvoite rusi kosi" ("Sun in Your Golden Hair"). In 1999, he released his debut album, Nekade vo noḱta (Somewhere in the Night). In the summer of the same year, Proeski performed his first solo concert in Skopje.

In the year 2000, Proeski participated in the Eurovision pre-selection for Macedonia in SkopjeFest. He sang "Solzi pravat zlaten prsten" ("Tears Make a Golden Ring"), which won the televoting from the public; however, he finished third overall behind Karolina Gočeva and the winners XXL. During that period, he began recording tracks for his second album, Sinot božji (The Son of God), which was promoted by the end of June 2000. The album included songs such as "Nemir" ("Restless") (a duet with Karolina Gočeva), "Vo kosi da ti spijam" ("Sleeping in Your Hair"), "Izlaži me ušte ednaš" ("Lie to Me One More Time"), as well as "Iluzija" ("Illusion") (Grand Prix at the festival Slavianski Bazaar in Vitebsk) and "Tajno moja" ("Secret of Mine"). Two songs are composed by Kire Kostov (winning second prize at the festival Sunčane Skale, held in Herceg Novi, now Montenegro).

The Serbian production house BK Sound purchased the rights to release Proeski's latest album in the other former Yugoslav republics, which led to his victory of the Oscar of Popularity in those former republics for the year of 2000, and his sold-out shows in Skopje and Belgrade. Proeski embarked on an Australian tour along with other Macedonian singers in 2001.

Rise to regional stardom
In 2001, Proeski gained wider regional popularity in the countries of former-Yugoslavia, by placing second at the Sunčane Skale festival held on 12, 13 and 14 July in Herceg Novi with the song "Sonce vo tvoite rusi kosi", written by G. Koprov, O. Nedelkovski and K. Ikonomov.

After spending his time in recording studios in Athens, Greece, Proeski released his third album "Ako me pogledneš vo oči" ("If You Look into My Eyes") in October 2002 in Macedonian and Serbian. After the release, Proeski went on a tour throughout Macedonia doing intense promotion. He also went to Serbia, Bosnia and Herzegovina, and Bulgaria for further promotion. Proeski won Beovizija in Belgrade in April 2003, with "Čija si" ("To Whom Do You Belong?"), a song that became a huge hit in Macedonia and the other former Yugoslav republics. This song was due to represent Serbia and Montenegro in the Eurovision Song Contest 2003 but the EBU stated that too many countries wanted to enter in that year and so some would be forced to withdraw. Serbia and Montenegro (who participated as one country at the time) were one of them.

To improve his singing, Proeski took classes in New York from maestro William Riley, who was also coach to famous tenor, Luciano Pavarotti. When he returned, Proeski held humanitarian concerts throughout Macedonia. He was awarded with the Mother Teresa Humanitarian Award and in 2003 he became a Regional UNICEF Ambassador.

In 2004, MKTV chose Proeski to represent Macedonia at the Eurovision Song Contest 2004 in Istanbul, Turkey, and in February, he performed eight songs, where a jury, televoting, and his own opinion chose the song. The song "Angel si ti" ("You're an Angel") was chosen by all three. In April, Proeski released his album "Dan za nas" ("A Day For Us"), which featured the eight songs from the Eurovision selection in Macedonian.

In May, Proeski finished 14th with the song "Life", which was the English version of "Angel si ti". Prior to the contest, he was popularised by reporters due to his tremendous opera singing ability, at his press conferences.

All eight songs were recorded in English, but only the winning song of the national final, "Life", was released.  During the TV national final show, after each song was performed, a clip of the song was played in English to show viewers how it would sound if that song won the contest and was performed in English at the Eurovision Song Contest 2004 final.

In 2004 Proeski was named a UNICEF Goodwill Ambassador, and recorded the song "This World" which became the UNICEF anthem. Proeski signed a contract with Dallas Records so his next album could be released in Croatia and Slovenia. To establish himself in these countries, Proeski recorded "Krajnje vreme" with Slovenian singer, Anja Rupel. In 2005, Toše's fifth album Po tebe (After You) was released throughout ex-Yugoslavia. Po tebe is one of the most successful Balkan albums ever. It topped music charts for months in Macedonia, Serbia, Croatia, Slovenia and Bosnia and Herzegovina.

Božilak (Rainbow) was a compilation of 14 selected traditional Macedonian songs arranged by Saša Nikolovski Gjumar, Ilija Pejovski and Soni Petrovski. The artist was backed up by a symphony orchestra on the album.

His last album Igri bez granici (Macedonian title)/Igra bez granica (Serbo-Croatian title) ("Game Without Limits") was released all over ex-Yugoslavia in August 2007.

Apart from songs in Macedonian and Serbo-Croatian, he also recorded one song in Slovene, "Moja" ("Mine") in 2007, and one in Italian, "Aria" ("Air"), with Italian superstar, Gianna Nannini. The list of artists who collaborated with Proeski includes Anja Rupel, Antonija Šola, Bora Čorba, Karolina Gočeva, Esma Redžepova, Gianna Nannini, Goca Tržan, Grigor Koprov, Jeff Beck, Tony Cetinski, Željko Joksimović and other notable musicians. Prior to his death, he was a student in his final year in the solo singing department of the Skopje Music Academy.

Songwriting
Proeski also established himself as a songwriter. He wrote several hits for himself including "Ima li dan za nas" ("Is There A Day For Us"), "Slušaš li" ("Are You Listening"), "Malečka" ("Little One") and "Polsko cveḱe" ("Field Flower"). In 2004, Proeski composed "Muza" ("Muse") for Martin Vučić, the Eurovision Song Contest 2005 representative for Macedonia. It became the title track for the young artist's second album. In interviews, Proeski stated that he had written over 100 songs but was waiting for the right moments to record them as they were still in demo form.

Toše's last concert was held on 5 October 2007 for the Primary Education Project for USAID. The concert raised tens of thousands of euros for the primary schools of Macedonia. The concert was attended by over 40,000 people and viewed all over the world.

The night before his death, Proeski gave his final interview to the Macedonian Television Station Kanal 5. He talked about his intention to finish his Musical Academy studies, his search for his soul mate, and his new album in the works.

Super Toše
Fight against evil, eliminate enemies, and the victory of the good were the main points of the comic "Super Toše", where the main character was based on Toše Proeski. It was made as a part of the humanitarian campaign under the motto "Superheroe of humanity". The main character has all virtues and characteristics of Toše in aim to build a fictional superhero who will hopefully be an idol of the young. "TToše is idealized, but with this, we want to give the young faith that the good can defeat the evil", said Oliver Romevski, the author of "Super Toše". "His job was not easy. As a weapon, he had his super voice with which he tried to eliminate the evil and defeat his enemies, among who was Mr. Pirate, the common enemy of the world, who was smuggling kids, drugs, and weapons."

Eurovision Song Contest 2004
On the forty-ninth edition of the annual Eurovision Song Contest in 2004, Proeski represented Macedonia with the song Life. The song was selected on February 14, 2004, by televoting and 11 membered juries, in a competition with seven other songs written for Proeski.

The song was written by Ilija Nikolovski, directed by Jovan Jovanov. On the Eurovision Song Contest 2004, with his performance was powerful and energetic in a companion with the back vocals who made an art show on the stage, he got in the finale, where he got 49 points and ended in fourteenth place.

After the event, he admitted that he was not satisfied with his finish, putting it down to what he saw as Eurovision voting being based on stage direction as well as the song itself. However, in his home country he was given a warm welcome on his return.

Second big concert in Skopje
On 23 June 2006, he performed his second solo concert at the City Stadium in Skopje. The spectacular concert started with the dance group from Belgrade, in the rhythm of Toše's band, Blue Funky Individuals.

In the middle of the concert, he was joined by the ethnic singer Bilja Krstić and they performed the Macedonian folk song Jovano Jovanke in a duet. At the end of the performance, Bilja continued alone on the stage with her big hit Puce puska.

The concert lasted till midnight, but his fans didn't let him leave, so he got back on the stage and performed Po tebe again, alongside Zajdi zajdi, the Macedonian folk song.

Croatian Radio Festival
On 9 June 2007, Toše for the Croatian Radio Festival with his song Veži me za sebe won a Grand Prix award in the category for pop-rock and urban music with 16.589 points.

Third and final concert in Skopje
Under the motto "The education is everyone's responsibility", the pop star Tose Proeski on 5 October 2007 at 07:30 pm, performed his spectacular concert, again on the City Stadium in Skopje, supported by the organization USAID. The funds from the tickets (around 10.000 EUR) were used for the five-year project for renovating 100 elementary schools allover Macedonia, for bringing better educational programs and implementing educational reforms. At the press-conference in Hotel Continental Skopje, except Toše, other attendees were representatives of USAID. The director Michael Eddy said that he was proud to be working with a star from the rank of Toše Proeski. Toše said that the renovation of the school Nikola Karev in Krushevo (his hometown) is accelerated.

"It is an honor to be a part of a project like this and part of big plans for the education in Macedonia. Every concert of mine is dear to me, but the charity concerts are special to me and they will stay in me forever. If we can improve the education in Macedonia we will have a healthier society", said Toše.

At the press conference, he made a statement that he will feel like a Macedonian forever, and he will never leave his country. "The success is always glued with evil because that is in the nature of humans. I hope that I get the support from everyone to fight the evil because I can't do it on my own.", said Toše.

As guest stars, on his final concert, Toše was joined by Adrian Gaxha, Bojan Marović and Antonija Šola.

After the end of the concert, Toše and his band were given statuettes of Mother Teresa by the foundation of the same name as a thank you for the humanitarian work. Toše gave his statuette to his mother Dominika, who taught him about the importance of humanitarian work since he was young. Everything ended with the magnificent firework in honor of Toše.

Best lines from his concert that will never be forgotten were "Give me a starry sky" (when he asked his fans to turn on the flashlights on their phones).

The concert was represented on 6 January 2008 on A1 Televizija at 03:00 pm – 07:00 pm.

Death
During the early morning of 16 October 2007, at approximately 6:20 am, Proeski died in a car accident on the Zagreb–Lipovac highway near Nova Gradiška, Croatia. He was a passenger along with his manager Ljiljana Petrović in a Volkswagen Touareg driven by Georgi Georgievski. The Touareg crashed into the back of a truck and then into the median barrier, killing Proeski instantly, crushing the third vertebrae of his neck, although the truck sustained no damage. Proeski was asleep in the front passenger seat at the time of the crash. Of the other two passengers, only the driver suffered serious injuries (head trauma).

Proeski's body arrived at midnight in Skopje by helicopter of the Macedonian army, and was transported by car to his home town of Kruševo. Grieving citizens gathered to pay their last respects at the airport and also in Macedonia Square. The Embassy of the United States of America, the USAID and the Diplomatic mission of the European Union published official statements on the death of Toše Proeski. 17 October was pronounced a national day of mourning in Macedonia. The three days following his death were pronounced days of mourning in the City of Kruševo.

After his death, the government of the Republic of Macedonia, gave him the title "Honorable citizen of Macedonia".

State funeral

The government organized an official state funeral for Proeski, which was held on 17 October 2007 in his home town of Kruševo, including military honor ceremonies by the Ceremonial Guard Battalion of the Macedonian Army (personnel of which conducted an honorary rifle salute) and a military band. The funeral, which was broadcast by the national Macedonian TV, was attended by many domestic and foreign delegations, including the President Branko Crvenkovski, the Prime Minister Nikola Gruevski, members of the Macedonian Parliament and its President Ljubiša Georgievski and other high-ranking officials, the US and the EU Ambassadors Gillian Milovanovic and Erwan Fouéré and other diplomats, representatives of the Red Cross, the USAID and other organizations, sports clubs, etc. Also, the funeral was attended by many notable musicians from Macedonia and other countries, including: Karolina Gočeva, Kaliopi, Vlado Janevski, Lambe Alabakoski, Elena Risteska, Jovan Jovanov, Martin Vučić, Adrian Gaxha, Tijana Dapčević and her sister Tamara Todevska, Aki Rahimovski (the frontman of Parni valjak), Toni Cetinski, Ceca Ražnatović, Željko Joksimović, Vlado Georgiev and many others. The religious service was held by the Macedonian Orthodox Church led by the Archbishop Stephen of Ohrid, as Proeski was a declared Orthodox Christian.

Numerous websites, blogs, and internet forums are filled with the last messages from his fans and friends. A petition was available online for Toše Proeski to be remembered by naming educational facilities, like the local Center for Music Education in Bitola, where he had studied to carry his name. This petition is to promote an annual humanitarian concert, carrying his name "Toše Proeski" for the poor and disabled and those of desperate need of medical attention. A page for condolences can be found at the Kruševo municipality official website.

Since his death, each year on 25 January Mile Stojkoski as a symbol of grief and respect runs a marathon in his wheelchair from Prilep to Proeski's grave in Kruševo. Since 2008 Stojkoski run an additional long distance marathon starting from Kruševo in honor of Toše Proeski. These two notable Macedonians both received the Mother Teresa Award for their humanitarian accomplishments and shared a close friendship.

An online petition was held for a tribute to be paid to Toše Proeski at the Eurovision Song Contest 2008.  It gathered over 13,900 signings however it was not honored. Tamara Todevska, singer of the Macedonian Eurovision entry of this year said that their entry was dedicated to a few people including their "angel who is up there watching over us".

On 25 April 2011 "Memorial House Todor Proeski" has been opened in Kruševo. At World Architecture Festival (WAF) 2011, in Barcelona, the building won the award "People's Choice Award, by OpenBuildings" as the most beautiful one in the world.

Tribute concerts
On 5 October 2008, the anniversary of Proeski's last concert before his death a tribute concert was held in Skopje. Over twenty singers from various Balkan countries performed.

A documentary about the work of Toše Proeski was released on 12 February 2009 in cinemas all over Macedonia.

Another concert was held on 24 January 2010, the day before what would have been Toše's 29th birthday.

A memorial concert for Toše was held on 2 November 2018. It included many popular Balkan musicians and was held at the SCBT Arena.

National football stadium
On 9 April 2019, North Macedonia's government made a decision to rename the sports stadium "Philip II" in the capital city of Skopje in honour of Toše. The stadium's new name is "Toše Proeski National Arena".

Gallery
Immediately after Toše Proeski's death was announced, the citizens of Skopje and people from all around Macedonia, as well as foreigners, started to gather at the Macedonia Square bringing candles, flowers and messages of condolence in his memory. Also, many institutions such as schools, universities, sports clubs, and business companies joined the spontaneous commemorative campaign. Similar gatherings took place in many other cities around the country, but also around the Balkans, especially in the former Yugoslav countries and the diaspora. A mourning ceremony was organized in Sarajevo, Bosnia and Herzegovina near Skenderija, where around 2000 people gathered to light candles in memory of Toše Proeski.

Discography

Albums
 Nekade vo noḱta (1999)
 Sinot Božji (2000)
 Ako me pogledneš vo oči / Ako me pogledaš u oči (2002)
 Den za nas / Dan za nas (2004)
 Po tebe / Pratim te (2005)
 Božilak (2006)
 Igri bez granici / Igra bez granica (2007)
 The Hardest Thing (2009)

Compilations
 The Platinum Collection (2008)
 The Ultimate Collection (2009)
 Toše i prijatelji (2010)
 Toše: Poslednji pozdrav (2011)
 S ljubavlju od Tošeta (2011)
 The Platinum Collection (6 CD Box) (2012)
 The Best Of (2013)
 Secret Place (2018)

Filmography
 Zabranjena Ljubav one episode #1.402 Mladic Bosko (2006)
 Kako Ubiv Svetec Tose (2004)
 Nad Lipom 35 one episode #2.2 Himself (2007)

Singles chart positions
His chart toppers include:

An em dash (—) indicates that the single did not chart.

See also
 Music of Macedonia
 Music School "Toše Proeski"

References

External links

1981 births
2007 deaths
People from Prilep
Members of the Macedonian Orthodox Church
Eurovision Song Contest entrants for North Macedonia
Eurovision Song Contest entrants of 2004
Slavianski Bazaar winners
Beovizija contestants
Beovizija winners
21st-century Macedonian male singers
Macedonian pop singers
Road incident deaths in Croatia
Hayat Production artists
Macedonian people of Aromanian descent
Aromanian musicians
Aromanian-language singers
Croatian-language singers
Macedonian folk-pop singers